Alex Tsai (born 25 December 1953) is a Taiwanese politician and a member of the Kuomintang. He served as a legislator from 2008 to 2016.

Tsai graduated from the Taipei Municipal High School of Agriculture and Industry and the John F. Kennedy School of Government of Harvard University. He was one of the 3rd members of the National Assembly.

References

1953 births
Living people
Taipei Members of the Legislative Yuan
Harvard Kennedy School alumni
Politicians of the Republic of China on Taiwan from Yunlin County
Members of the 5th Legislative Yuan
Members of the 6th Legislative Yuan
Members of the 7th Legislative Yuan
Members of the 8th Legislative Yuan
Kuomintang Members of the Legislative Yuan in Taiwan